Manhattan Cowboy is a 1928 American silent Western film directed by J.P. McGowan and starring Bob Custer, Lafe McKee and Mary Mayberry.

Cast
 Bob Custer as Jack Steel 
 Lafe McKee as John Steel 
 Mary Mayberry as Alice Duncan 
 Slim Whitaker as Slim Sergeant 
 John Lowell as Bud Duncan 
 Lynn Sanderson as Bert Duncan 
 Mack V. Wright as Mack Murdock 
 Cliff Lyons as Tex Spaulding 
 Dorothy Vernon as Maggie

References

Bibliography
 John J. McGowan. J.P. McGowan: Biography of a Hollywood Pioneer. McFarland, 2005.

External links
 

1928 films
1928 Western (genre) films
Films directed by J. P. McGowan
1920s English-language films
American black-and-white films
Silent American Western (genre) films
1920s American films